Grażyna Strachota ( Grazyna Strachota-Szpakowska; born 8 September 1960, in Warsaw), is a Polish actress. She appeared in the  television series Aby do świtu... in 1992.

Filmography

Personal life 
Strachota is married to sports commentator Dariusz Szpakowski. They have 2 children together.

References

External links

1960 births
Living people
Actresses from Warsaw